Mont d'Or (from French: "golden mountain") may refer to:

Vacherin Mont d'Or, a type of cheese
Mont d'Or (Alps), a mountain in Switzerland
Mont d'Or (Jura Mountains), a mountain in France

See also
Monte d'Oro, a mountain on the island of Corsica, France